As was the custom since 1930, the 1949 Tour de France was contested by national and regional teams. The three major cycling countries in 1949, Italy, Belgium and France, each sent a team of 12 cyclists. Other countries sent teams of 6 cyclists: Switzerland, Luxembourg, Netherlands and Spain. Italy and Belgium also sent two extra teams of young riders of 6 cyclists each.
The French regional cyclists were divided into four teams of 12 cyclists: Ile de France, West-North, Centre-South West and South East. Altogether this made 120 cyclists.

There were 57 French cyclists, 22 Italian, 18 Belgian, 6 Dutch, 6 Luxembourg, 6 Spanish, 6 Swiss and 1 Polish cyclist.
In the previous year, Fausto Coppi refused to enter the Tour de France because of personal problems with his teammate Gino Bartali. Bartali had won the previous Tour, and was trying to equal Philippe Thys by winning the Tour three times. Coppi had won the 1949 Giro d'Italia, and wanted to be the first one to achieve the Tour-Giro double in one year. The Italian team manager Alfredo Binda convinced them two weeks before the start of the race to join forces, so both Italians were in the race.

Start list

By team

By rider

By nationality

References

1949 Tour de France
1949